Fulton High School is an independent high school in the Fulton Independent School district. It is located in Fulton, Kentucky, United States. The principal is Nathan Castleman.

References

External links

Schools in Fulton County, Kentucky
Public high schools in Kentucky